Turks in Yemen, also known as Turkish Yemenis and Yemeni Turks, refers to the ethnic Turks who live in Yemen.

History
The majority of today's Yemeni Turks are the descendants of the Ottoman Turkish settlers who began to migrate to the region as part of the expansion of the Ottoman Empire, which controlled, at least nominally, the region for over 300 years. The Yemen Eyalet (province) of the Ottoman Empire covered much of modern Yemen.

Demographics
Today, estimates of the Turkish community in Yemen range from more than 10,000 to 100,000 About 6,000 live in Sana'a.

Some 150 kilometres from Yemen’s capital, Sanaa, Beyt al-Turki is inhabited by Turkish inhabitants who first moved to the area around 200 years ago. The surname of most of the residents in this village is “Turki.”

Notable people
 Cahide Sonku, first female film director in Turkey

See also  
Turkey–Yemen relations
Turkish minorities in the former Ottoman Empire
Turks in the Arab world
 Yemen Eyalet

References

Bibliography 
 

 .

Yemen
Ethnic groups in Yemen